The Presbyterian Church in Korea (JungRip) traces its origin to the mainline and non-mainline division of Presbyterian Church in Korea (HapDong). Later some Presbyterian Church in Korea (TongHap) pastors and hapDong pastors gathered under the motto of "Return to the early church and aim at one Gospel church". After a prayer meeting they formed the JungRip church in 1981. Some members formed the PyungYang seminary later renamed as the Seoul Westminster Seminary. The church teaches the verbal inspiration of the Bible. It subscribes the Apostles Creed and Westminster Confession. In 2004 there were 75,007 members and 451 congregations and 454 ordained ministers. The denomination had 13 Presbyteries and a General Assembly.

References 

Presbyterian denominations in South Korea
Presbyterian denominations in Asia